Tablan (also Romanized as Tablān; also known as Tablū, Tahbalu, and Tablow) is a village in Nimbeluk Rural District, Nimbeluk District, Qaen County, South Khorasan Province, Iran. At the 2006 census, its population was 64, in 26 families.

References 

Populated places in Qaen County